Primal may refer to:

Psychotherapy
 Primal, the core concept in primal therapy, denotes the full reliving and cathartic release of an early traumatic experience
 Primal scene (in psychoanalysis), refers to the witnessing by a young child of a sex act, usually between the parents, which traumatizes the child

Mathematics
 Primal, an old mathematics term for a projective hypersurface
 Primal problem, a component of the duality principle in mathematical optimization theory

Entertainment
 "Primal" (Eureka episode), an episode of TV series Eureka
 Primal (video game), an action video game for the PlayStation 2
 Primal (TV series), a 2019 animated television series
 Primal (2019 film), a 2019 film starring Nicolas Cage
 Optimus Primal, a character in Transformers
 The Lost Tribe (2010 film), a film whose Australian DVD was entitled Primal
 Primal (2010 film), an Australian horror film directed by Josh Reed
 Far Cry Primal, a 2016 video game

Other
 Primal cut, several types of cuts of meat
 Primal Pictures, the producer of 3D Interactive Anatomy Software

See also
 Primal Fear (disambiguation)
 Prime (disambiguation)